Joseph Michael Francis Ryan III (born June 20, 1957) is an associate judge of the Superior Court of the District of Columbia.

Education and career 
Ryan earned his Bachelor of Arts from College of William and Mary in 1979 and his Juris Doctor from National Law Center at George Washington University in 1982.

After graduating, Ryan clerked for Judge Richard B. Latham of the Sixth Judicial Circuit Court in Montgomery County, Maryland. From 1985 to 2002, he was a staff attorney at the Public Defender Service for the District of Columbia.

D.C. Superior Court 
President George W. Bush nominated Ryan on January 21, 2003, to a 15-year term as an associate judge of the Superior Court of the District of Columbia. On June 18, 2003, the Senate Committee on Homeland Security and Governmental Affairs held a hearing on his nomination. On October 22, 2003, the Committee reported his nomination favorably to the senate floor. On October 24, 2003, the full Senate confirmed his nomination by voice vote. He was sworn in on January 16, 2004.

References

1957 births
Living people
21st-century American judges
College of William & Mary alumni
George Washington University Law School alumni
Judges of the Superior Court of the District of Columbia